Willi Trakofler (born 27 April 1973) is an Italian snowboarder. He competed in the men's giant slalom event at the 1998 Winter Olympics.

References

External links
 

1973 births
Living people
Italian male snowboarders
Olympic snowboarders of Italy
Snowboarders at the 1998 Winter Olympics
People from Welsberg-Taisten
Sportspeople from Südtirol
20th-century Italian people